Kourovka may refer to:
 Kourovka, Sverdlovsk Oblast, a settlement in Sverdlovsk oblast
 Kourovka railway station, a station on Trans-Siberian Railway
 Kourovka Notebook, a list of open problems in group theory
 4964 Kourovka, a minor planet